Black Allan or Allan F-1 (1886  1910) was the foundation sire of the Tennessee Walking Horse. He was out of a Morgan mare named Maggie Marshall and by Allendorf, a stallion descended from Narragansett Pacer, Canadian Pacer, and Gaited Spanish Mustang imported from Texas. Black Allan was registered as No.7623 by the American Trotting Registry. Although Black Allan was supposed to be a trotter, he preferred to pace and so never raced. Besides the pace, he performed a lateral ambling gait now known as the running walk. He was a black stallion standing , 5 feet high. He was given the designation Allan F-1 when the Tennessee Walking Horse Breeders' Association, precursor to the Tennessee Walking Horse Breeders' and Exhibitors' Association, was formed in 1935. He had multiple owners throughout his life, but his last owners, James Brantley and Albert Dement, were the only ones to recognize Black Allan's use as a breeding stallion. Black Allan sired 111 known foals in his lifetime, among them Roan Allen, registration number F-38, Hunters Allen F-10, and Merry Legs F-4. Black Allan died September 17, 1910, at the age of 29.

Life

Black Allan was foaled on a limestone pasture in the middle of Tennessee, in 1886, out of the Morgan mare Maggie Marshall and by Allendorf. Black Allan was a black stallion standing , with a sock on his left hind foot, coronet on his right hind foot, and a star on his forehead.  He was registered with the American Trotting Registry and given registration number 7623.
He was sold many times throughout his life, the first time at the side of his dam. He was bought by George Ely, who already owned an 1882 colt out of Maggie Marshall, Elyria, whose record for trotting the mile was 2:25. Ely hoped Black Allan would compare to the older colt, but sold him in 1891 when he discovered that Black Allan was a 'pacer'. It is now known that Black Allan also performed the lateral ambling gait known as the running walk. He was lightly raced, but was unable to produce a burst of speed toward the end of his races and generally finished last. Nonetheless, due to his looks, early speed and long stride, he was put to stud. One owner, J.A. McCulloch, used Black Allan as a "teaser" to see if mares were in estrus before they were bred to jack donkeys to produce mules. Another owner traded him for a black filly, a milk cow and $20. When Black Allan was sold to his most famous owner, James Brantley, in 1903, his purchase price was $110. He was sold without papers, but Brantley eventually recovered his registration certificate. Brantley rode Black Allan himself, and his son French Brantley sometimes rode the horse to school. At the very end of Black Allan's life,  he was sold by James Brantley to Albert Dement of Wartrace, Tennessee, one of the earliest Tennessee Walking Horse breeders. The horse's price was $140, and he was sold with the guarantee that he would live through the breeding season. Dement stood Allan at stud for only a few months before Allan's death, during which the stallion was bred to 111 mares. He died at Dement's farm on September 16, 1910 at the age of 29 years old.

Bloodlines and offspring 

Black Allan's pedigree traced back to Justin Morgan, the foundation sire of the Morgan breed, on his dam's side and to Hambletonian 10, the foundation sire of the Standardbred on his sire's side. Black Allan sired an estimated 111 foals.  Three of his offspring, Roan Allen F-38, Merry Legs F-4, and Hunters Allen F-10, were given special registration numbers beginning in the designation F, which mark them as foundation bloodstock. Most of Black Allan's best offspring, including Roan Allen and Merry Legs, were produced from crosses on American Saddlebred mares, especially those from Denmark bloodlines.

Due to Black Allan's influence and potency in passing his gait and conformation to his offspring, he was given registration number F-1 when the Tennessee Walking Horse Breeders' Association, the precursor to the Tennessee Walking Horse Breeders' and Exhibitors' Association, was formed in 1935. Today he is considered the foundation sire of the Tennessee Walking Horse breed, one of the few American breeds that names a single horse with this honor.

Pedigree

Notes

References

Bibliography 
 The Tennessee Walking Horse, Western Horseman, October 1994

1886 animal births
1910 animal deaths
Individual Tennessee Walking Horses
Foundation horse sires